John Isham may refer to:
Sir John Isham (1582–1651), High Sheriff of Northamptonshire 
John Isham (composer) (1680–1726), English composer and organist
John Isham Farmstead, on the National Register of Historic Places listings in Lucas County, Ohio
John William Isham (1866–?), American vaudeville impresario